Giuseppe Mettica (26 March 1919 – 5 May 2003) was an Italian professional football player.

References

1919 births
2003 deaths
A.S.D. Fanfulla players
Association football midfielders
Inter Milan players
Italian footballers
Serie A players